NGC 7522 is an astronomical object whose identity is in question. It was originally catalogued as a faint nebula. Although SIMBAD identifies it as PGC 70742, this is unlikely, due to the faintness of the galaxy. Instead, it is possible that a nearby star was accidentally catalogued as a nebula.

References

7522
Unidentified astronomical objects